David Wasson may refer to:

 Dave Wasson, American television producer, director and screenwriter
 David Atwood Wasson (1823–1887), American minister and Transcendentalist author